STBC can stand for:

Samavesam of Telugu Baptist Churches, — a denomination of Christian churches in India
Space–time block code, a form of space–time code used in wireless telecommunications
Shatin Baptist Church, a Christian church in Hong Kong
Star Trek: Bridge Commander, a computer game
Sulu Tawi-Tawi Broadcasting Corporation, a television company in the Philippines